It's Complicated is the eighth studio album by Da' T.R.U.T.H. Mixed Bag Music alongside Next Music released the album on June 3, 2016.

Critical reception

Awarding the album four stars at CCM Magazine, Andy Argyrakis writes, "Da’ T.R.U.T.H. rolls up his sleeves and digs right into the complexities of religion throughout It's Complicated, Vol. 1." Kevin Hoskins, giving the album three and a half stars from Jesus Freak Hideout, states, " not all is great on It's Complicated. Somewhere around the middle of the album, the music turns into something unpleasant to the ears."

Track listing

Charts

References

2016 albums
Da' T.R.U.T.H. albums